Daniel Samir Chopra (born 23 December 1973) is a Swedish professional golfer.

Chopra was born in Stockholm, Sweden. He represents Sweden and his mother was Swedish, but his father was Indian and Daniel moved to India at age seven where he was raised by his grandparents. He won the All-India Junior Golf Championship at age 14.

Chopra turned professional in 1992. From 1996 to 2002 he played intermittently on the European Tour, sometimes failing to retain his tour card, and in 2004 he joined the U.S.-based PGA Tour.

In 2007 he won his first PGA Tour event at the Ginn sur Mer Classic at Tesoro. Two PGA Tour events later he picked up another win at the season opening Mercedes-Benz Championship. After his second PGA Tour win, Chopra's career started to fluctuate between the PGA Tour and second-tier (what was then) Nationwide Tour.

A difficult 2010 season, where he made only eight PGA Tour cuts in 28 events, cost him his Tour Card. He won the Nationwide Tour's Fresh Express Classic at TPC Stonebrae in 2011. Chopra regained his PGA Tour card for 2012 after finishing 19th on the money list. He finished 188th on the Tour's money list and went back to the newly renamed Web.com Tour for 2013. He finished 21st on the 2013 Web.com Tour regular season money list to earn his 2014 PGA Tour card. In 2013–14, he made only 2 cuts in 16 events and finished 249th on the FedEx Cup points list and lost his PGA Tour card.

In 2015, with limited status on either the PGA or Web.com Tour, Chopra won the Asian Tour's qualifying school.

Chopra is now a regular part of Fox Sports' golf coverage.

Amateur wins
1988 All India Junior Championship
1990 All India Junior Championship
1991 All India Junior Championship, Doug Sanders World Junior Championship

Professional wins (14)

PGA Tour wins (2)

PGA Tour playoff record (1–0)

Asian Tour wins (1)

Nationwide Tour wins (3)

*Note: The 2011 Fresh Express Classic was shortened to 54 holes due to fog.

Challenge Tour wins (2)

Swedish Golf Tour wins (1)

Other wins (5)
1993 Johor Baru Open (Malaysia)
1994 Indian Masters, Malaysian PGA Championship, Indian PGA Championship
1995 Taiwan Open

Playoff record
European Tour playoff record (0–1)

Results in major championships

CUT = missed the half-way cut
"T" = tied

Results in The Players Championship

CUT = missed the halfway cut
"T" indicates a tie for a place

Results in World Golf Championships

QF, R16, R32, R64 = Round in which player lost in match play
"T" = Tied

See also
2003 PGA Tour Qualifying School graduates
2011 Nationwide Tour graduates
2013 Web.com Tour Finals graduates

References

External links

Swedish male golfers
European Tour golfers
PGA Tour golfers
Asian Tour golfers
Korn Ferry Tour graduates
Indian people of Swedish descent 
Swedish people of Indian descent
Swedish emigrants to India
Swedish Hindus
Golfers from Stockholm
Golfers from Orlando, Florida
Golfers from Perth, Western Australia
1973 births
Living people